Pandanus balfourii, also known as , is a species of plant in the family Pandanaceae, one of four Pandanus species that are endemic to the Seychelles.

Description
Pandanus balfourii is a small, slender, elegant tree of about 8 meters in height, with small supporting roots, and bearing its drooping leaves in spiral rosettes. Its medium-sized fruit-body (25 cm) hangs from the stem and contain 70-90 individual fruits.

Distribution and habitat
It is endemic to Seychelles, and was especially common on all the granitic islands. 
It was formerly extremely common along the coast, and its local name  refers to this habitat preference. However, it has been known to live in more rocky areas at higher altitudes too. 
It is threatened by habitat loss.

Other indigenous Pandanus of the Seychelles include Pandanus sechellarum, Pandanus hornei and Pandanus multispicatus. The Madagascan species Pandanus utilis is introduced and is now also widespread.

Gallery

References

External links
 

Flora of Seychelles
balfourii
Vulnerable plants
Endemic flora of Seychelles
Taxonomy articles created by Polbot